John Miles may refer to:

Politicians
John Miles (Australian politician) (1930–2010), Australian politician and member of the Victorian Legislative Council
John E. Miles (1884–1971), U.S. Representative from New Mexico 
John George Miles (1838–1884), New Zealand politician
John Miles (MP for Bristol), British member of parliament for Bristol
Jack Miles (political activist) (1888–1969), Scottish-born Australian communist leader
John Miles (fl. 1404), British member of parliament for Great Grimsby

Sports
John Miles (footballer) (born 1981), English footballer
John Miles (racing driver) (1943–2018), British former Formula One driver
John Miles (baseball) (1922–2013), baseball player
Johnny Miles (1905–2003), Canadian marathon runner
Johnny Miles (footballer) (born 1945), Australian rules footballer

Others 
John Miles, developer of the Miles Sound System
John Miles (businessman) (1816–1886), English bookseller and major North London landowner
John Miles (actor) (1923–2006), American actor
John Miles (musician) (1949–2021), English vocalist, guitarist and keyboard player
John DeBras Miles, Indian agent for the Cheyenne and Arapaho Indian Reservation
John 'Smoaker' Miles (1728–1797), Brighton bather to the Prince Regent
John W. Miles (1920–2008), professor in theoretical fluid mechanics
John Myles (minister), also known as "Miles", the founder of the earliest recorded Baptist Church in Wales
Jack Miles (born 1942), American author
John Campbell Miles (1883–1965), Australian prospector and pastoral worker
John Miles (microbiologist), New Zealand microbiologist and epidemiologist

See also
John Myles (disambiguation)
Jack Miles (disambiguation)